David Perdiguero Márquez (born 26 April 1974) is a Spanish football manager.

Career
Born in Madrid, Perdiguero worked at several youth sides in his native region, before joining CD Leganés' youth setup in 2015. In July 2019, after working at Atlético Madrid, he was hired by the Bolivian Football Federation to work as manager of the under-13 and under-15 squads.

Perdiguero subsequently returned to Spain, after being named manager of CD Atlético Aluche CF in the regional leagues. On 22 July 2021, he returned to Bolivia after being named manager of Real Santa Cruz in the place of Néstor Clausen.

Perdiguero's first professional match occurred on 26 July 2021, a 5–0 home routing over San José. Despite avoiding relegation and remaining undefeated at home, he opted to leave the club on 31 December as his contract expired.

Perdiguero returned to Bolivia and its top tier on 28 May 2022, taking over Universitario de Vinto, but was sacked on 15 August.

References

External links

1974 births
Living people
Sportspeople from Madrid
Spanish football managers
Bolivian Primera División managers
Real Santa Cruz managers
Spanish expatriate football managers
Spanish expatriate sportspeople in Bolivia
Expatriate football managers in Bolivia
F.C. Universitario de Vinto managers